

551001–551100 

|-id=014
| 551014 Gorman ||  || Alice Gorman (born 1964) is an Australian archaeologist, a pioneer in the field of space archaeology. || 
|}

551101–551200 

|-bgcolor=#f2f2f2
| colspan=4 align=center | 
|}

551201–551300 

|-id=231
| 551231 Żywiec ||  || Żywiec is a town in southern Poland. || 
|-id=233
| 551233 Miguelanton ||  || Miguel Anton (1950–2021) was a Spanish chemist, mathematician and programmer, and a friend of astronomer Rafael Ferrando, who co-discovered this minor planet. || 
|}

551301–551400 

|-bgcolor=#f2f2f2
| colspan=4 align=center | 
|}

551401–551500 

|-bgcolor=#f2f2f2
| colspan=4 align=center | 
|}

551501–551600 

|-bgcolor=#f2f2f2
| colspan=4 align=center | 
|}

551601–551700 

|-bgcolor=#f2f2f2
| colspan=4 align=center | 
|}

551701–551800 

|-bgcolor=#f2f2f2
| colspan=4 align=center | 
|}

551801–551900 

|-bgcolor=#f2f2f2
| colspan=4 align=center | 
|}

551901–552000 

|-bgcolor=#f2f2f2
| colspan=4 align=center | 
|}

References 

551001-552000